Fimbristylis dictyocolea is a sedge of the family Cyperaceae that is native to Australia.

It blooms between February to June and produces green-brown flowers.

In Western Australia it is found in and around swamps, creeks and pools of water in the Kimberley region.

References

Plants described in 1954
Flora of Western Australia
dictyocolea
Taxa named by Stanley Thatcher Blake